The Nubian pyramids were built by the rulers of the ancient Kushite kingdoms. The area of the Nile valley known as Nubia, which lies within the north of present-day Sudan, was the site of three Kushite kingdoms during antiquity. The capital of the first was at Kerma (2500–1500 BCE). The second was centered on Napata (1000–300 BCE). The third kingdom was centered on Meroë (300 BCE-AD 300). The pyramids are built of granite and sandstone. 

Heavily influenced by the Egyptians, Nubian kings built their own pyramids 1000 years after Egyptian burial methods had changed. In Nubia, pyramids were built for the first time at El Kurru in 751 BC. The Nubian-style pyramids emulated a form of Egyptian private elite family pyramid that was common during the New Kingdom. There are twice as many Nubian pyramids still standing today as there are Egyptian. Forty of the pyramids were partially demolished by an Italian treasure hunter, Giuseppe Ferlini, in the 1830s. The Nubian pyramids are a UNESCO World Heritage Site.

Pyramids
The Nubian pyramids were built over a period of a few hundred years to serve as tombs for the kings and queens and wealthy citizens of Napata and Meroë.

The first three sites are located around Napata in Lower Nubia, near the modern town of Karima.

The first of these was built at the site of el-Kurru, including the tombs of King Kashta and his son Piye, together with Piye's successors Shabaka, Shabataka, and Tanwetamani. Fourteen pyramids were constructed for their queens, several of whom were renowned warrior queens. This can be compared to approximately 120 much larger pyramids that were constructed in Ancient Egypt over a period of 3000 years.

This necropolis was the burial place of 21 kings and 52 queens and princes including Anlami and Aspelta. The bodies of these kings were placed in huge granite sarcophagi. Aspelta's weighed 15.5 tons, and its lid weighed four tons. The oldest and largest pyramid at Nuri is that of the Napatan king and Twenty-fifth Dynasty pharaoh Taharqa.

Another small group of nine pyramids is located next to Jebel Barkal itself.

During the Meroitic period, over forty queens and kings were buried there.

Between 2009 and 2012 the new group of pyramids was discovered near the village Sedeinga.

Most also have offering temple structures abutting their base with unique Kushite characteristics. By comparison, Egyptian pyramids of similar height generally had foundation footprints that were at least five times larger and were inclined at angles between 40–50°.

The tombs inside the pyramids of Nubia were plundered in ancient times. Wall reliefs preserved in the tomb chapels reveal that their royal occupants were mummified, covered with jewellery and laid to rest in wooden mummy cases. At the time of their exploration by archaeologists in the 19th and 20th centuries, some pyramids were found to contain the remains of bows, quivers of arrows, archers' thumb rings, horse harnesses, wooden boxes, furniture, pottery, colored glass, metal vessels, and many other artefacts attesting to extensive Meroitic trade with Egypt and the Hellenistic world.

A pyramid excavated at Meroë included hundreds of heavy items such as large blocks decorated with rock art and 390 stones that comprised the pyramid. A cow buried complete with eye ointment was also unearthed in the area to be flooded by the Meroë Dam, as were ringing rocks that were tapped to create a melodic sound.

In the 1830s Giuseppe Ferlini came to Meroe seeking treasure and raided and demolished a number of pyramids which had been found “in good conditions” by Frédéric Cailliaud just a few years earlier. At Wad ban Naqa, he leveled the pyramid N6 of the kandake Amanishakheto starting from the top, and finally found her treasure composed of dozens of gold and silver jewelry pieces. Overall, he is considered responsible for the destruction of over 40 pyramids.

Having found the treasure he was looking for, in 1836 Ferlini returned home. A year later he wrote a report of his expedition containing a catalog of his findings, which was translated in French and republished in 1838. He tried to sell the treasure, but at this time nobody believed that such high quality jewellery could be made in Sub-Saharan Africa. His finds were finally sold in Germany: part of these were purchased by king Ludwig I of Bavaria and are now in the State Museum of Egyptian Art of Munich, while the remaining – under suggestions of Karl Richard Lepsius and of Christian Charles Josias von Bunsen – was bought by the Egyptian Museum of Berlin where it still is.

George Reisner, a Harvard archaeologist, investigated the pyramids at Nuri and mapped more than 80 royal Kushite burials in 1916–1919.  Reisner started to explore burial chambers but he found they were flooded by the rising water table. He abandoned further excavation because he thought it was too dangerous, probably because a collapse of a staircase had killed five of his workers. Some of his findings were published in 1955.

National Geographic funded explorations from 2015 to 2019 using underwater scuba diving equipment and remote controlled robots.

Pyramids and cemeteries
 The royal cemetery at el-Kurru. Kashta, Piye, Tantamani, Shabaka and several queens are buried in pyramids at El-Kurru.
 Pyramids of Gebel Barkal
 Royal cemetery at Nuri. Kings Taharqa, Atlanersa and other royals from the kingdom of Napata are buried at Nuri.
 Pyramids of Meroe (Begarawiyah). Dating to the Meroitic period. Pyramids date from c. 720–300 BC at the South Cemetery and c. 300 BC to c. 350 AD at the North Cemetery.
 Sedeinga pyramids

See also
 Ancient Egypt
 Candace of Meroë
 Kingdom of Kush
 List of megalithic sites
 Meroë
 Nubia
 Nubian architecture
 Sedeinga pyramids

Explanatory notes

References

External links

 Pyramids of Nubia – A site detailing the three major pyramid sites of ancient Nubia
 Nubian Pyramids – A site featuring numerous photographs of the pyramids at Meroë
 Aerial Photographs of Sudan – A site featuring spectacular aerial photographs of the pyramids and temples at el-Kurru, Nuri, and Meroë
 Aerial video of Nubia Pyramids
 Voyage au pays des pharaons noirs Travel in Sudan and notes on Nubian history 
 Labelled map of the pyramids at Meroe

Archaeological sites in Sudan
Pyramids
Kingdom of Kush
Pyramids
Pyramids in Sudan